The 2001 Pan American Gymnastics Championships were held in Cancún, Mexico, October 2–7, 2001.

Medalists

Artistic gymnastics

Rhythmic gymnastics

Medal table

References

2001 in gymnastics
Pan American Gymnastics Championships
International gymnastics competitions hosted by Mexico
2001 in Mexican sports